Glipa atripennis is a species of beetle in the genus Glipa. It was described in 1923.

References

atripennis
Beetles described in 1923